EAT or eat may refer to eating: the process of consuming food, for the purpose of providing for the nutritional needs of an animal. The term may also refer to:

Music
 Eat (band), a British independent rock band active 1986–1995
 Eat, 1998 album by Charming Hostess
 Eat (NXT Soundtrack) an EP by Poppy

Television
 "Eat" (Yo Gabba Gabba!), an episode
 Eat: The Story of Food, 2014 American documentary television series
 Ehime Asahi Television, a television station in Ehime Prefecture, Japan

Other uses
 Eat (restaurant), a UK sandwich shop chain
 Eat (film), an underground film created by Andy Warhol

Acronyms and codes

Automotive
 Electronic automatic transmission, a type of vehicle automatic transmission

Healthcare
 Eating Attitudes Test
 Ectopic atrial tachycardia, an abnormal heart condition

Organizations
 Employment Appeal Tribunal, in Britain
 Experiments in Art and Technology

Transportation
 European Air Transport (Belgium), a defunct airline for DHL
 European Air Transport Leipzig, a German parcel-carrier airline for DHL
 Pangborn Memorial Airport, Washington state, US, IATA code
 International vehicle registration code for East Africa Tanzania

Other acronyms and codes
 e.a.t., et aliis titulis (Latin for and other titles)
 East Africa Time
 Export Address Table, a dynamic-link library term for its structure of  descriptors

See also
EATS (disambiguation)